Life on Death Road is the ninth studio album by Jørn Lande's solo project Jorn.

The album was released on June 2, 2017. It features the debut of a new lineup with all the instrumentalists, at the time, from the band Voodoo Circle: Mat Sinner (also a member of Primal Fear, Sinner and Kiske/Somerville) on bass, Francesco Jovino (ex-Primal Fear, ex-Hardline, ex-Sunstorm) on drums, Alex Beyrodt (Primal Fear, Silent Force) on guitar and Alessandro Del Vecchio (Hardline, Sunstorm, Edge of Forever, Silent Force) on keyboards and production. Del Vecchio had previously worked with Jørn on the album of cover songs Heavy Rock Radio and this time did most of the songwriting on Life on Death Road.

The album also features guest appearances by guitarists Gus G and Craig Goldy.

Track listing

Personnel

Musicians
Jørn Lande – vocals, producing
Alex Beyrodt – guitars
Mat Sinner – bass
Francesco Jovino – drums
 Alessandro Del Vecchio  – keyboards, producing, recording, mixing, mastering

Additional musicians
Gus G  – guitar solo on tracks 1 and 3, all guitars on track 10
Craig Goldy – guitar solo on track 1

Additional personnel
Lasse "Lazz" Jensen - additional musical arrangements, vocals engineering

References 

2017 albums
Frontiers Records albums
Jørn Lande albums